Krug is a German surname meaning jug, and therefore it is an occupational surname based on occupation of a jug/mug seller/manufacturer or of an innkeeper. Notable people with the surname include:

 Adam Krug (born 1991), American professional ice hockey player
 Arnold Krug (1849–1904), German composer
 Barbara Krug (born 1956), German athlete
 Brian Krug (born 1976), Inventor of the self-cleaning bottle cap
 Charles Krug (1825–1892), founder, first winery in Napa Valley, California
 Diederich Krug (1821–1880), German pianist and composer
 Edward A. Krug (1911–1979), American education historian
 Etienne Krug, Belgian physician and epidemiologist
 Frederick Krug (1855–1930), German founder of Krug Brewery and Krug Park in Omaha, Nebraska
 Hellmut Krug (born 1956), German football referee
 Jessica Krug, professor of history who revealed in 2020 that she had falsely pretended to have Afro-Caribbean heritage
 Johann-Joseph Krug (1800–1866), German founder of the Champagne Krug (Champagnerhauses Krug)
 Judith Krug (1940–2009), American librarian
 Julius Albert Krug (1907–1970), American Secretary of the Interior under President Harry Truman
 Karl Wilhelm Leopold Krug (1833–1898), German botanist
 Manfred Krug (1937–2016), German writer and actor
 Marty Krug (1888–1966), German baseball player
 Mikhail Krug (1962–2002), Russian singer
 Róger Krug Guedes (born 1996), Brazilian footballer
 Shirley Krug (born 1958), American politician
 Spencer Krug (born 1977), Canadian musician
 Torey Krug (born 1991), American professional ice hockey player 
 Wilhelm Traugott Krug (1770–1842), German philosopher

See also
 
 Krug (disambiguation)
 Crug (disambiguation)

References

Occupational surnames